Robert Täht (born 15 August 1993) is an Estonian volleyball player, member of the Estonian national team. At the professional club level, he plays for Vôlei São José dos Campos

Club career
Robert Täht began his professional career in 2010 at the age of 17, when he signed a contract with his hometown club Valio Võru. In 2012 he moved to top Estonian team Bigbank Tartu. After three seasons in Tartu, Täht signed his first foreign contract and joined Polish PlusLiga team Cuprum Lubin. Täht played the 2018–19 season for Arkas İzmir of the Turkish Men's Volleyball League and the 2019–20 season for 
the Italian Volleyball League powerhouse Sir Safety Perugia. For the next two seasons he returned to Polish PlusLiga to play for Asseco Resovia and Skra Bełchatów. In June 2022 Täht signed with Vôlei São José dos Campos of the Brazilian Volleyball Super League becoming the first Estonian to play in the Brazilian league.

National team
As a member of the senior Estonia men's national volleyball team, Täht competed at the 2015, 2017, 2019 and 2021 CEV European Championships. With the national team Täht won the 2016 European League title and was named MVP of the tournament. He helped Estonia win their second European League title in 2018.

Sporting achievements

Clubs
 Baltic League
  2013/2014 – with Bigbank Tartu
  2014/2015 – with Bigbank Tartu

 National championships
 2013/2014  Estonian Championship, with Bigbank Tartu
 2014/2015  Estonian Championship, with Bigbank Tartu
 2018/2019  Turkish Championship, with Arkas İzmir
 2019/2020  Italian SuperCup, with Sir Safety Perugia

Individual awards
 2011: Young Estonian Volleyball Player of the Year
 2014: Baltic League – Best Server
 2015: Baltic League – Most Valuable Player
 2015: Baltic League – Best Server
 2016: European League – Most Valuable Player
 2016: European League – Best Outside Spiker
 2016: Estonian Volleyball Player of the Year
 2017: Estonian Volleyball Player of the Year
 2018: Estonian Volleyball Player of the Year
 2019: Estonian Volleyball Player of the Year

References

External links
 
 Player profile at LegaVolley.it  
 Player profile at PlusLiga.pl  
 Player profile at Volleybox.net 

1993 births
Living people
Sportspeople from Võru
Estonian men's volleyball players
Estonian expatriate volleyball players
Estonian expatriate sportspeople in Poland
Expatriate volleyball players in Poland
Estonian expatriate sportspeople in Turkey
Expatriate volleyball players in Turkey
Estonian expatriate sportspeople in Italy
Expatriate volleyball players in Italy
Cuprum Lubin players
Resovia (volleyball) players
Skra Bełchatów players
Outside hitters
Estonian expatriate sportspeople in Brazil
Expatriate volleyball players in Brazil